Peter Moon may refer to:

Sir Peter Moon (diplomat) (1928–1991), British high commissioner and ambassador
Peter Moon (comedian) (born 1953), Australian comedian
Peter Moon, author of books relating to the postulated Montauk Project
Peter Moon (musician) (1944–2018), Hawaiian musician
Sir Peter Moon (born 1942), 5th Baronet of Portman Square